The Mahāvākyas (sing.: mahāvākyam, महावाक्यम्; plural: mahāvākyāni, महावाक्यानि) are "The Great Sayings" of the Upanishads, as characterized by the Advaita school of Vedanta  with mahā meaning great and vākya, a sentence. Most commonly, Mahāvākyas are considered four in number, 

Like other Mahāvākyas, it also explains the unity of Brahman and Atman, which is the basic principle of Advaita Vedanta.
 Tat Tvam Asi (तत् त्वम् असि) - traditionally rendered as "That Thou Art" (that you are), (Chandogya Upanishad 6.8.7 of the Sama Veda, with tat in Ch.U.6.8.7 referring to sat, "the Existent"); alternatively translated as "That's how [thus] you are," with tat in Ch.U.6.12.3  referring to "the very nature of all existence as permeated by [the finest essence]"
 Aham Brahmāsmi (अहं ब्रह्मास्मि) - "I am Brahman", or "I am Divine" (Brihadaranyaka Upanishad 1.4.10 of the Yajur Veda)
 Prajnanam Brahma (प्रज्ञानं ब्रह्म) - "Prajñāna is Brahman", or "Brahman is Prajñāna" (Aitareya Upanishad 3.3 of the Rig Veda)
 Ayam Atma Brahma (अयम् आत्मा ब्रह्म) - "This Self (Atman) is Brahman" (Mandukya Upanishad 1.2 of the Atharva Veda)
Those statements are interpreted as supporting the insight that the individual self (jiva) which appears as a separate existence, is in essence (atman) part and manifestation of the whole (Brahman).

The four principal Mahavakyas
Though there are many Mahavakyas, four of them, one from each of the four Vedas, are often mentioned as "the Mahavakyas". Other Mahavakyas are:
 ekam evadvitiyam brahma - Brahman is one, without a second (Chāndogya Upaniṣad)
 so 'ham - I am that (Isha Upanishad)
 sarvam khalv idam brahma - All of this is brahman (Chāndogya Upaniṣad 3.14.1)
 etad vai tat - This, verily, is That (Katha Upanishad)

People who are initiated into sannyasa in Advaita Vedanta are being taught the four [principal] mahavakyas as four mantras, "to attain this highest of states in which the individual self dissolves inseparably in Brahman". According to the Advaita Vedanta tradition, the four  Upanishadic statements indicate the real identity of the individual (jivatman) as sat (the Existent), Brahman, consciousness. According to the Vedanta-tradition, the subject matter and the essence of all Upanishads are the same, and all the Upanishadic Mahavakyas express this one universal message in the form of terse and concise statements. In later Sanskrit usage, the term mahāvākya came to mean "discourse", and specifically, discourse on a philosophically lofty topic.

Tat Tvam Asi

Chandogya Upanishad 6.8.7, in the dialogue between Uddalaka and his son Śvetaketu. It appears at the end of a section, and is repeated at the end of the subsequent sections as a refrain:

In ChU.6.8.12 it appears as follows:

Etymology and translation
Tat Tvam Asi (Devanagari: तत्त्वमसि, Vedic: tát tvam ási) is traditionally translated as "Thou art that", "That thou art", "That art thou", "You are that", "That you are", or "You're it";  although according to Brereton and others the proper translation would be "In that way [=thus] are you, Svetaketu", or "that's how you are": 
 tat - "it", "that"; or alternatively "thus", "in that way", "that's how". 
 tvam - you, thou
 asi - are, 'art'

In Ch.U.6.8.7 tat refers to Sat, "the Existent", Existence, Being. Sat, "the Existent", then is the true essence or root or origin of everything that exists, and the essence, Atman, which the individual at the core is. As Shankara states in the Upadesasahasri: 

While the Vedanta tradition equates sat ("the Existent") with Brahman, as stated in the Brahma Sutras, the Chandogya Upanishad itself does not refer to Brahman.

According to Brereton, followed by Patrick Olivelle and Wendy Doniger, 
 the traditional translation as "you are that" is incorrect, and should be translated as "In that way [=thus] are you, Svetaketu." That, then, in ChU.6.8.12 refers to "the very nature of all existence as permeated by [the finest essence]", and which is also the nature of Svetaketu. Lipner expresses reservations on Brereton's interpretation, stating that it is technically plausible, but noting that "Brereton concedes that the philosophical import of the passage may be represented by the translation 'That you are', where tat as 'that' would refer to the supreme Being (sat/satya)."

Interpretation
Major Vedantic schools offer different interpretations of the phrase:
Advaita - absolute equality of 'tat', the Ultimate Reality, Brahman, and 'tvam', the Self, Atman.
Shuddhadvaita - oneness in "essence" between 'tat' and individual self; but 'tat' is the whole and self is a part.
Vishishtadvaita -'tvam' denotes the Jiva-antaryami Brahman while 'tat' refers to Jagat-Karana Brahman.
Dvaitadvaita - equal non-difference and difference between the individual self as a part of the whole which is 'tat'.
Dvaita of Madhvacharya - Sa atmaa-tat tvam asi in Sanskrit is actually Sa atma-atat tvam asi or 'Atma (Self), thou art, thou art not God”. In refutation of Mayavada (Mayavada sata dushani), text 6, tat tvam asi is translated as "you are a servant of the Supreme (Vishnu)".
Acintya Bheda Abheda - inconceivable oneness and difference between individual self as a part of the whole which is 'tat'.

Aham Brahma Asmi
Ahaṁ Brahmāsmi (Devanagari: अहम् ब्रह्मास्मि), "I am Brahman" is in the Brihadaranyaka Upanishad 1.4.10 of the Shukla Yajurveda:

Prajñāna as a whole means:
 Adjective: well-known; wise
 Noun: knowledge, "consciousness", "intelligence", "wisdom"
Brahman:
 "The Absolute"; "infinite"; "the highest truth"

Meaning:

Most interpretations state: "Prajñānam (noun) is Brahman (adjective)". Some translations give a reverse order, stating "Brahman is Prajñānam", specifically "Brahman (noun) is Prajñānam (adjective)": "The Ultimate Reality is wisdom (or consciousness)". Sahu explains:

And according to David Loy,

Ayam Ātmā Brahma

Ayam Atma Brahma is a Mahāvākya which is found in the Mandukya Upanishad of the Atharvaveda. According to the Guru Gita, "Ayam Atma Brahma" is a statement of practice.

Etymology and meaning
The Sanskrit word ayong means 'it'. Ātman means ‘Atma’ or 'self'. Brahman is the highest being. So "Ayam Atma Brahma" means 'Atma is Brahman'.

Source and Significance
The Mahavakya is found in the Mundaka Upanishad of the Atharva Veda. It is mentioned in the Mundaka Upanishad 1-2,

In Sanskrit:

The Mundaka Upanishad, in the first section of the second Mundaka, defines and explains the Atma-Brahma doctrine.

It claims that just as a burning fire produces thousands of sparks and leaps and bounds in its own form, so the living beings originate from Brahman in its own form. Brahman is immortal, except the body, it is both external and internal, ever generated, except the mind, except the breath, yet from it emerges the inner soul of all things.

From Brahman breath, mind, senses, space, air, light, water, earth, everything is born. The section expands on this concept as follows,

In the Upanishad, verse 2.2.2, the Mundaka Upanishad claims that Atma-Brahma is real. Verse 2.2.3 offers help in the process of meditation, such as Om. Verse 2.2.8 claims that the one who possesses self-knowledge and has become one with Brahman is free, not affected by Karma, free from sorrow and Atma-doubt, he who is happy. The section expands on this concept as follows,

Etymology and translation
 sarvam etad - everything here, the Whole, all this
 hi - certainly
 brahma - Brahman
 ayam - this
 ātmā - Atman, self
 brahma - Brahman
 so 'yam ātmā - "this very atman"
 catuṣpāt - "has four aspects"

While translations tend to separate the sentence in separate parts, Olivelle's translation uses various words in adjunct sets of meaning:
 सर्वं ह्येतद् ब्रह्म sarvam hyetad brahma - "this brahman is the Whole"
 ब्रह्मायमात्मा brahma ayam atma - "brahman is ātman"
 ब्रह्म सोऽयमात्मा brahman sah ayam atman - "brahman is this (very) self"

The Mandukya Upanishad repeatedly states that Om is ātman, and also states that turiya is ātman. The Mandukya Upanishad forms the basis of Gaudapada's Advaita Vedanta, in his Mandukya Karika.

See also
 Advaita Vedanta
 Jiva
 Monism
 Soham (Sanskrit)
 Vakya Vritti
 Ajativada
 I Am that I Am
 Al-Hallaj

Notes

References

Sources

Printed sources

Web-sources

Further reading
 S. Radhakrishnan: The Principal Upanishads

External links

 Chandogya Upanishad
 Chandogya Upanishad
 Swami Sivananda, Tat Tvam Asi, Right Significance of TAT TVAM ASI
 Ram Chandran , tattvam asi
 Mahavakyas
 माण्डूक्योपनिषत्, Mandukhya Upanishad – Sanskrit Text, sanskritdocuments.org, Encoded by  M. Giridhar giridhar at chemeng.Isc.ernet.in Proofread by John Manetta
 Lecture on Atman by Swami Sarvapriyananda (Video)
 Mandukhya Upanishad with Gaudapada Karika and Sankara Bhashya-Swami Nikhilananda
 Tattva Bodha-Swami Gurubhaktananda

Hindu philosophical concepts
Advaita Vedanta

pl:Mantra#Mahawakja